Yoshinori Niwa (born in 1982, Aichi Prefecture, Japan) is a Japanese artist currently based in Vienna, Austria, his self-explanatory work as social interventions realised through diverse media including performance, video and installation.

Biography 
He was born in Aichi Prefecture, Japan and graduated from Tama Art University department of moving image and performing arts in 2005. His career started as a performance artist in early 2000, and he has been making documentary style videos internationally such as in Europe and Asia. In early 2010, he started a series project which re-exams the history of communism in Eastern Europe in Bucharest, Romania, and he did a project in which he was looking for people who still had something Lenin-related in their apartments for the group show Double Vision: Contemporary Art From Japan at the Moscow Museum of Modern Art in 2012. The series works had exhibited at Mori Art Museum, Tokyo and Alkatraz Gallery, Ljubljana and Edel Assanti, London.

As his project Selling the Right to Name a Pile of Garbage, he was actually running an auction to sell the rights to temporarily rename a part of huge garbage Landfill in Novaliches, the Philippines in collaboration with local landfill operation company WACUMAN Inc. and a lawyer in 2015. As of December 25, 2014, the highest bidding price was 4,600 Filipino Peso. The result of this auction had shown at the Vargas Museum, Metro-manila.

Works 
Tossing Socialists in the Air in Romania, 2010
Exchanging between Turkish Lira and Euros in Istanbul until there is nothing left, 2011
Looking for Vladimir Lenin at Moscow Apartments, 2012
Selling the Right to Name a Pile of Garbage, 2014
Paying a Courtesy Call on the Incumbent Mayor by All His Predecessors in History, 2016

Exhibitions 
Double Vision: Contemporary Art From Japan, The Moscow Museum of Modern Art, 2012
Aichi Triennale 2013
Roppongi Crossing 2013: OUT OF DOUBT, Mori Art Museum, 2013
Setouchi Triennale 2016

Publications 
Historically Historic Historical History of Communism, Art-Phil, 2015
Reenacting Publicness. The Interventionist Projects, My Book Service, 2014

References

External links 
 Artist page - Edel Assanti
 Artist page - 1335MABINI
 Official website

1982 births
Living people
21st-century Japanese artists
Artists from Aichi Prefecture
Tama Art University alumni
Japanese expatriates in Austria